Human trafficking in popular culture refers to depictions of human trafficking, the illegal trade of human beings for the purposes of reproductive slavery, commercial sexual exploitation, forced labor, or a modern-day form of slavery. It has been featured in a variety of popular culture forms and on numerous occasions. This topic has been discussed more and more around the world within the past several years.

Film and video

Literature and publications
(Alphabetical by author's last name)
 The 2019 novel, Big Sky written by Kate Atkinson exposes a human trafficking ring based in North Yorkshire.
 A 2006 Punisher story arc called "The Slavers", written by Garth Ennis, dealt with the horrors of human trafficking and sex slavery.
 The 2009 play, She Has a Name, by Andrew Kooman, winner of the Scripts at Work/Alberta Playwrights Network Award
 The 2009 novel, The Girl Who Played with Fire by Stieg Larsson
 The 2009 novel, A False Dawn, by Tom Lowe (St. Martins Press) depicts the horrors of human trafficking in the U.S.
 The 2008 autobiography, The Road of Lost Innocence by Somaly Mam
 Terry Lee Wright's novel, River of Innocents follows the 17-year-old Majlinda into the world of modern-day slavery, where she struggles to hold on to her humanity and to help the stolen children around her survive.

Music videos
 Soul Asylum's music video of "Runaway Train" shows human traffic.

Television
(alphabetical by series)
 Sony TV's Indian series Crime Patrol, based on true events, has covered this topic.
 Criminal Minds episode 6.24, "Supply and Demand", addresses a human trafficking ring that abducts stressed-out college students.
 The CSI: NY episode, "She's Not There", showcases the horrors of human trafficking when a Russian tourist is murdered and a girl goes missing.
 Everyone wants to be with Marilyn (Todos quieren con Marilyn) is a prime-time soap opera produced by RCN Televisión, in a partnership with UNODC Colombia, which informs millions of viewers about human-trafficking within the context of sexual exploitation. The final part of the show follows the story of a young woman who travels abroad thinking she will become a model, only to end up working against her will as a prostitute. Marilyn, in the meantime, sets up an NGO that assists victims of trafficking and offers support to women wishing to abandon the world of prostitution. The soap opera's main male character plays a UNODC staff member who is working on a national campaign that is part of its Anti-Human Trafficking Project.
 Graceland season 2, anti-human trafficking and anti-sex trafficking groups.
 The TV miniseries Human Trafficking (2005) by Christian Duguay stars Mira Sorvino, Donald Sutherland, and Robert Carlyle and tells the stories of a 16-year-old girl from Ukraine, a single mother from Russia, an orphaned 17-year-old girl from Romania, and a 12-year-old American tourist who become the victims of international sex slave traffickers. Sorvino and Sutherland are the Immigration and Customs Enforcement (ICE) agents who struggle to save them.
 Inhuman Traffic (2005) is one of numerous MTV EXIT (End Exploitation and Trafficking) documentary specials that addresses human trafficking.
 The European series Matroesjka's deals with girls from ex-Soviet countries, who have been deceived into sex slavery in Belgium.
 A character from the anime television series Symphogear (2012), Chris Yukine, was abducted by a gang in South America after the deaths of her parents in a civil war. She was forced into sex trafficking at the age of seven. Chris was freed six years later by the UN's intervention in Val Verde and subsequently transferred to Japan, only to be kidnapped again by main villain Finé upon her arrival. Finé further abuses Chris emotionally and sexually, and Chris shows symptoms of Stockholm syndrome towards Finé.
 in the Canadian/UK TV drama Sex Traffic (2004).
 Human trafficking (women trafficking) is portrayed in the Brazilian soap opera Salve Jorge (2012).
 The second season of the crime drama The Wire (2003) revolves around the discovery of 13 dead women in a shipping container in Baltimore port, and the subsequent investigation.
 Vidas Robadas (2007) Argentinean telenovela about human traffic. The telenovela was filmed in the small town of Zelaya, belonging to the Partido del Pilar, in the Province of Buenos Aires. The story unfolds in cases of kidnapping to force people to practice prostitution, and brings parallels with the case of Marita Verón. Susana Trimarco, mother of Marita Verón, advised the screenwriters Marcelo Camaño and Guillermo Salmerón.

References

Human trafficking in fiction
Topics in popular culture
Works about human trafficking